German submarine U-569 was a Type VIIC U-boat of Nazi Germany's Kriegsmarine during World War II.

She was a member of 15 wolfpacks.

Design
German Type VIIC submarines were preceded by the shorter Type VIIB submarines. U-569 had a displacement of  when at the surface and  while submerged. She had two shafts and two  propellers.

U-569 was fitted with five  torpedo tubes (four fitted at the bow and one at the stern), fourteen torpedoes, one  SK C/35 naval gun, 220 rounds, and a  C/30 anti-aircraft gun. The boat had a complement of between forty-four and sixty.

Service history
The submarine was laid down on 21 May 1940 at Blohm & Voss, Hamburg as yard number 545, launched on 20 March 1941 and commissioned on 8 May under the command of Kapitänleutnant Hans-Peter Hinsch.

She served with the 3rd U-boat Flotilla from 1 August 1941 for training and stayed with that organization for operations until her loss from 1 August 1941 to 22 May 1943.

First and second patrols
U-569s first patrol was from Trondheim in Norway, she headed for the Atlantic Ocean via the gap separating Iceland and the Faroe Islands. She arrived at St. Nazaire in occupied France, on 21 September 1941.

Having left St. Nazaire on 12 October 1941, U-569 made for the Newfoundland and Labrador coast. She returned to her French base on 12 November.

Third patrol
The submarine was attacked by a Fairey Swordfish west of Gibraltar on 16 December 1941. She, along with four other U-boats, was to have operated in the Mediterranean, but the damage was such that she had to return to St. Nazaire.

Fourth and fifth patrols
U-569 sank the Hengist on 8 March 1942 northwest of Cape Wrath (Scotland) and returned to France (La Pallice), on 2 April 1942.

On her fifth sortie, she damaged the Pontypridd northeast of St. Johns, Newfoundland, on 11 June 1942 and took the master prisoner. She returned to La Pallice on the 28th.

Sixth and seventh patrols
The boat was attacked by the Norwegian corvette HNoMS Potentilla on 25 August 1942. The warship lost the element of surprise and her intention to ram when her 4 in gun opened fire prematurely. Several hits were scored on the conning tower by 20mm AA guns, but the larger weapon failed to register in the encounter in mid-Atlantic.

The boat's seventh patrol was relatively peaceful with no contacts.

Eighth patrol
U-569 was attacked by the escorts of Convoy UC-1 on 23 February 1943 and seriously damaged. She had departed La Pallice on 7 February 1943 and returned there on 13 March.

Ninth patrol and loss
The boat was badly damaged by depth charges dropped by a TBM Avenger, piloted by William F. Chamberlain, from the escort carrier  on 22 May 1943. A relief Avenger also from USS Bogue, piloted by Howard S. Roberts, was waiting overhead when the U-boat resurfaced. Roberts dropped more depth charges and machine-gunned the bridge to prevent the German crew from manning the antiaircraft guns. U-boat Commander Johannsen had no intention of fighting back and, according to American records ordered his crew to raise a white flag on the periscope. Upon seeing this, Roberts ceased his attack and guided the Canadian destroyer  to the area. As the destroyer approached, Johannsen ordered his crew to scuttle the boat and jump overboard. St. Laurent rescued Johannsen and 24 of his crew of 46 and the survivors were sent to Washington for interrogation.

Wolfpacks
U-569 took part in 15 wolfpacks, namely:
 Grönland (14 – 27 August 1941)
 Markgraf (27 August – 16 September 1941)
 Schlagetot (20 October – 1 November 1941)
 Raubritter (1 – 8 November 1941)
 Westwall (2 – 12 March 1942)
 York (12 – 26 March 1942)
 Hecht (8 May – 18 June 1942)
 Lohs (11 August – 21 September 1942)
 Draufgänger (1 – 11 December 1942)
 Ungestüm (11 – 22 December 1942)
 Robbe (16 – 26 February 1943)
 Amsel 3 (3 – 6 May 1943)
 Rhein (7 – 10 May 1943)
 Elbe 1 (10 – 14 May 1943)
 Mosel (19 – 22 May 1943)

Summary of raiding history

References

Bibliography

External links

German Type VIIC submarines
U-boats commissioned in 1941
U-boats scuttled in 1943
U-boats sunk by US aircraft
1941 ships
Ships built in Hamburg
World War II submarines of Germany
Maritime incidents in May 1943